The Rapture is a 1991 drama film written and directed by Michael Tolkin. It stars Mimi Rogers as a woman who converts from a swinger to a born-again Christian after learning that a true Rapture is upon the world.

The low-budget film was a box office disappointment while critical reception was largely positive, with Rogers's performance praised as perhaps the best of her career.

Plot
Sharon, a young Los Angeles woman, engages in a swinging, libidinous lifestyle. She comes into contact with an unnamed Christian sect that advises her the Rapture is imminent based on their interpretations of strange dreams experienced by congregants.

In time, Sharon comes to accept this belief herself and becomes a born-again Christian. She then starts living a pious life, eventually marrying and having a daughter, Mary. When her husband Randy is killed in a senseless murder, however, she begins to question the benevolence of God. She believes God has called her to go to the desert to wait for the Rapture, and instead of leaving her daughter safely with friends, she decides Mary must come with her. Foster, a police officer, is concerned for their well-being after they are reduced to stealing food while they wait, but Sharon is insistent that the end is near.

Sharon begins to despair after a period of time, and at her daughter's urging, decides to hasten their ascendance to Heaven. She kills Mary with a gunshot but is unable to take her own life afterwards, afraid she will be condemned as having killed herself. She confesses to Foster what she had done and is jailed.

After an apparition of Mary (accompanied by two angels) appears in the night, the Rapture occurs. While Sharon sits in her cell early the next morning, a loud trumpet blast is heard all over the world, signaling the start of the Rapture. Later on, Sharon and Foster, after driving out into the desert, are both raptured to a Purgatory-like landscape. Foster, who had been an atheist his whole life, accepts God and is allowed entrance to Heaven, but Sharon blames God for Mary's death, even though God did not tell her to take Mary with her to the desert, and she cannot renounce her anger at what she sees as God's cruelty. Mary pleads with her to accept God back into her heart so she can join her and Randy in Heaven, but Sharon refuses, choosing to remain alone in the purgatory-like landscape for eternity.

Cast
 Mimi Rogers as Sharon
 David Duchovny as Randy
 Kimberly Cullum as Mary
 Darwyn Carson as Maggie
 Patrick Bauchau as Vic
 James LeGros as Tommy
 Will Patton as Deputy Foster
 Sam Vlahos as Wayne
 Stéphanie Menuez as Diana
 Marvin Elkins as bartender

Production
The film was shot in Los Angeles over six weeks.

Casting
Prior to Rogers's involvement, Sissy Spacek, Meg Ryan, and Rachel Ward passed on taking the role of Sharon. Tolkin noted that Rogers's Scientology beliefs played no bearing on her casting: "Mimi's background in Scientology played no role in my casting her, nor did I see it as a problem—we never even discussed it." Rogers added that "my own religious views didn't affect my approach to the picture at all." In another interview, though, she noted that the role was easier thanks to her view of Jesus: 

Rogers and Duchovny would later go on to star together in The X-Files.

Reception

Box office
The Rapture grossed $1.3 million at the North American box office against a production budget of $3 million.

Critical response
On review aggregator website Rotten Tomatoes, the film has an approval rating of 65% based on 31 reviews, with an average rating of 6.4/10. 

Rogers especially won praise for her performance, with the Los Angeles Times calling it an "astonishingly stunning performance." Entertainment Weekly noted that Rogers "delivers a subtle and complex performance." Critic Robin Wood declared Rogers "gave one of the greatest performances in the history of the Hollywood cinema."

Roger Ebert gave The Rapture 4/4 stars and praised Tolkin for avoiding the "pious banalities" of most religious movies, instead "examining the logic of the final judgment as radically and uncompromisingly as he can." 

A mixed review came from Peter Travers of Rolling Stone, who said Tolkin "earns points simply for trying" to make a serious religious film in the 1990s Hollywood film industry, yet by the final scenes The Rapture drifts into "loopy melodrama and blunts what had been the keen edge of Rogers's performance." John Simon of the National Review described The Rapture as "a piece of apocalyptic trash megalomaniacal to the point of imbecility".

References

Further reading

External links

 
 

1991 independent films
1990s fantasy drama films
1991 films
American fantasy drama films
American independent films
American mystery drama films
Films about the rapture
Films scored by Thomas Newman
Films about religion
Films about the seven seals
Films directed by Michael Tolkin
Films set in Los Angeles
Films shot in California
Films shot in Los Angeles
Metaphysical fiction films
New Line Cinema films
Films with screenplays by Michael Tolkin
Fiction about purgatory
1991 drama films
Filicide in fiction
1990s English-language films
1990s American films